John Bodenham (c. 1559–1610), an English anthologist, was the patron of some of the Elizabethan poetry anthologies.

Life
Bodenham was the eldest of the five children of William Bodnam, a London grocer, and Katherine Wanton of York.
He was educated at Merchant Taylors' School.

According to Arthur Henry Bullen in the Dictionary of National Biography, Bodenham did not himself edit any of the Elizabethan miscellanies attributed to him by bibliographers. He simply projected the publication of them and befriended their editors.

Works
Politeuphuia (Wits' Commonwealth) (1597)
Wits' Theater (1598)
Belvidere, or the Garden of the Muses (1600)
England's Helicon (1600). This "prints for the first time [Christopher] Marlowe's 'The Passionate Shepherd to his Love', with [Sir Walter] Ralegh's reply."

References

Attribution
 

1550s births
1610 deaths
16th-century English writers
16th-century male writers
17th-century English writers
17th-century English male writers
People educated at Merchant Taylors' School, Northwood
Anthologists
English male writers